Bill Johnson (born December 16, 1951) is an American actor, known for his role as Leatherface in the 1986 horror film The Texas Chainsaw Massacre 2.

Career

Texas Chainsaw Massacre 2
Johnson was chosen to play Leatherface in The Texas Chainsaw Massacre 2. Despite negative reviews from critics due in part to the film relying much more on gore and black comedy than its predecessor, the film has become a cult classic and it gained Johnson notoriety as one of the six actors to have portrayed the character.

Other projects
Johnson also appeared in the Ultima series of role-playing games, as the voice of the Guardian, the final antagonist of the Ultima series. He also likes to act in the local theaters.

Filmography
 1980 Fast Money as Cop (uncredited)
 1985 Future-Kill as Splatter's Elite Guard
 1985 Confessions of a Serial Killer as Oil Rig Worker (uncredited)
 1986 The Texas Chainsaw Massacre 2 as Leatherface
 1987 The Texas Comedy Massacre as Leatherface
 1988 D.O.A. as Desk Sergeant (credited as "William Johnson")
 1988 Paramedics as Caesar "Big Caesar"
 1988 Full Moon in Blue Water as Stranger #2
 1988 Talk Radio as Fan #1
 1997 Redboy 13 as FBI Agent
 1999 Crosswalk as Ellis Baird (short film)
 2005 Fall to Grace as Auggie
 2005 The Fantastic Escape as Troll (short film)
 2010 Ultimate Guide to Flight as Chess Player
 2012 Butcher Boys as Mr. Grimm
 2012 Supernatural Activity as Mike Powers
 2015 Kill or Be Killed as Hugo

References

External links
Bill Johnson's Official Site

1951 births
Living people
American male film actors
Male actors from Austin, Texas